Ruth Halperin-Kaddari (born 15 May 1966) is an Israeli legal scholar and international women's rights advocate who is known for her work on family law, feminist legal theory, women's rights in international law, and women and religion. She was a member of the United Nations Committee on the Elimination of Discrimination against Women from 2006 to 2018, and was the committee's vice chair during several terms. She is Professor of Law at the Bar-Ilan University and is the founding Academic Director of the Ruth and Emanuel Rackman Center for the Advancement of the Status of Women. She is also involved in international academic collaborations on the theme of women, state, and religion, and participates in international litigations as an expert on Israeli family law.

She was one of the first recipients of the U.S. Secretary of State's International Women of Courage Award for her work on international women's rights in 2007. She was ranked as one of the world's hundred most influential people in gender equality policy in 2018.

Career

Halperin-Kaddari is a daughter of Menachem Zvi Kaddari, a noted linguist and expert on ancient Semitic languages who was rector of the Bar-Ilan University.

She studied law at the Bar-Ilan University, where she earned her LL.B. in 1989. She subsequently earned an LL.M. in 1990 and a Doctor of Juridical Science in 1993, both at Yale Law School in the United States. She is Professor of Law at the Bar-Ilan University; in 2001 she founded the Ruth and Emanuel Rackman Center for the Advancement of the Status of Women, a social-legal centre that works to advance gender justice, and she has served as the centre's Academic Director since its establishment.

United Nations roles
She was elected by the state parties to a four-year term on the United Nations Committee on the Elimination of Discrimination against Women in 2006 and was vice chairperson of the committee from 2009 to 2010. At the time of her election she was the committee's youngest member. She was reelected to her second term on the committee in 2010 and to her third term in 2014. She was again elected vice chairperson of the committee in 2017. On the committee she served for over a decade alongside the former French Minister of Gender Equality Nicole Ameline and the UN Special Representative on Sexual Violence in Conflict and UN Under-Secretary-General Pramila Patten.

During her term on CEDAW she led the successful adoption (in 2013) of a new General Recommendation on Economic Consequences of Family Relations and their Dissolution; and has conducted (in 2018) the Inquiry into North-Ireland's restrictive abortion regime, co-authored the UN report which concluded that the lack of provision for abortion in Northern Ireland is a form of violence against women., all of which led in October 2019 to decriminalization of abortions in Northern-Ireland, an unprecedented move in international human rights law.

The Ruth and Emanuel Rackman Center for the Advancement of the Status of Women
In 2001 she founded the Ruth and Emanuel Rackman Center for the Advancement of the Status of Women, a social-legal centre that works to advance gender justice, and she has served as the centre's director since its establishment. Established at Bar-Ilan University’s Faculty of Law with the goal of improving women’s status and bringing an end to gender discrimination and inequality in Israeli society, The Rackman Center is now proud to be the forefront organization of legal and social change for women in family law in Israel, working to fulfill the vision of advancing women’s rights, and bettering women’s standing within family law in general and Jewish family law in particular.

Honours
She is a recipient of numerous research grants and prizes, including two major grants from the Israel Science Foundation (2000, 2005); the Zeltner Award for Young Legal Scholars (2000); The Pogach Award for research in Jewish Law (2001-2002), The Belush Israel Feminist Award, US/Israel Women to Women (2002),  The Dafna Izraeli Award for Gender Research (together with Dr. Bryna Bogoch) (2004), The Eleanor P. Jacobson Woman of Valor Award for Hadassah–Brandeis Institute Exceptional Research Award Applicants (together with Dr. Eyal Katvan) (2006), The Hadassah-Brandeis Institute Research Award (together with Dr. Eyal Katvan) (2006), The International Award for Woman of Courage, U.S. State Department (2007), The Israeli Bar Association Central District Person of the Year in Law (2010), The "Ot Katan" Award for the Advancement of Gender Justice through Voluntary Work, awarded by the Ruach Nashit NGO in Israel (2014), The Rappaport Prize for Women Generating Change in Israeli Society (2016), in January 2017 she received the Knights of Quality (Academia category), awarded by the Movement for Quality Government in Israel. In 2018 she was named on Apolitical’s 100 most influential people in gender policy around the world.

Publications
Husband's Adultery as a Ground for Divorce, 7 Mehkarei Mishpat (Bar- Ilan Law Studies) 297-329 (1989) 
"One who is Two: Maternal-Fetal Relationship and Substance Abuse during Pregnancy", Plilim Journal,1997
Redefining Parenthood, California Western International Law Journal, Vol. 29, No. 2, 1999
Opening remarks in memory of Professor Ariel Rosen Zvi, 1999
Gender Construction under Halakhic Marriage and Divorce Laws Orthodox Feminism Conference, 1999
Women, Religion and Multiculturalism in Israel, UCLA Journal of International Law and Foreign Affairs 339-366 (2000) 
More on Legal Pluralism in Israel, Bar-Ilan University Law Review, 2000
Religion as a formative factor of the status of women in Israel, Bar-Ilan University, 2001
Halakhic Marriage and divorce law and gender construction, Being A Jewish Woman, 2001
The Boundary of Confronting the ‘Father’s Tongue’, Sayings of Mothers (Judaism Here and Now, Am Oved, 2002)
And Thou Shall Teach Them to Your Sons, Not to Your Daughters” – Inclusion and Exclusion of Women in Halakhic Language, 18 Mehkarei Mishpat (Bar-Ilan Law Studies) 353-372 (2002) 
Towards Concluding Civil Family Law – Israel Style, 17 Mehkarei Mishpat (Bar-Ilan Law Studies) 105-157 (2001)
Women in Israel: A State of Their Own'', Pennsylvania University Press, 2004
"Tav Lemeitav Tan Du Mi-Lemeitav Armalu: An analysis of the Presumption, The Edah Journal, 2004
Feminist Legal Theory, Social Change, and the Advancement of Women in Israel, Tarbut Democratit Journal, 2006
Co-Optation, Competition and Resistance: Mediation and Divorce Professionals in Israel, International Journal of the Legal Profession, Vol. 14, No. 2, 2007
Moral Considerations in Family Law and a Feminist Reading of Family Cases in Israel, Readings in Feminism, Gender and Law Journal, 2007
The Feminist Proposal Is Really Ridiculous, Mehkarei Mishpat, 2009
The Missing Women's Enigma: The Scope of the Get Refusals Predicament in Israel,  Being A Jewish Woman (Vol.5, Tovah Cohen ed.) (2009) 83-95. 
Religion, Politics and Gender Equality among Jews in Israel, United Nations Research Institute for Social Development and Heinrich Boll Foundation, 2010
Exposing Family Secrets: The Implications of Computerized Databases for the Creation of Knowledge in Family Law in Israel, Tel Aviv University Law Review, 2011
Economic Consequences of Marriage and Its Dissolution: Applying a Universal Equality Norm in a Fragmented Universe, Theoretical Inquiries in Law, Vol 13, 2012
Exposing Family Secrets: The Implications of Computerized Databases for the Creation of Knowledge in Family Law in Israel, Tel-Aviv University Law Review, 2013
When the Woman Becomes a Lawyer': Rosa Ginzberg and Her Battle to Become a Lawyer in Pre-State Israel, Bar-Ilan Press, 2013
The Hidden Law, The Lawyer (The Israeli Bar Association Journal), April 2013, 112-115 (together with Adi Blutner)
The Ruling Rules in Custody Disputers – on the Dangers of the Parental Sameness Illusion in a Gendered Reality, Mishpat vemimshal, 2014 
Collaborative Divorce: Separate but Equal, The Lawyer (The Israeli Bar Association Journal), June 2014, 121-125
Forward: Has the Time come for Civil Marriage in Israel? Introduction for Civil Marriage Debate, 6 Zehuyot 101 (Van-Leer Institute Journal for Jewish Culture and Identity) (2015)
Backlash Goes Global: Men's Groups, Patriarchal Family Policy, and the False Promise of Gender-Neutral Laws, Canadian Journal of Women and the Law, Vol. 28, 2016
The Chaos in Child Support Decisions in Cases of Joint Physical Custody: Critique of the Caselaw and of the Shifman Committee's Report, IDC Law Review, Volume 19, 2017
International Human Rights and Israel as Seen in the Work of the Treaty Bodies: Do They Walk the Talk?, Israel Law Review, 2017
The Chaos in Child Support Decisions in Cases of Joint Physical Custody: Critique of the Caselaw and of the Shifman Committee's Report, Mishpat Ve-Asakim (Law&Business) 1235-1269 (2016) (IDC Law Review) 
F.A.R. 1709, 919/15 Anonymous - Presentation and Analysis, 2017
Chief Justice Beinisch as a Female Judge
The Guiding Rules in Custody Disputes: On the Dangers of the Parental Sameness Illusion in a Gendered Reality, MISHPAT UMIMSHAL Journal, 2018
Wife Support: From Perception of Difference to Perception of [In]Equality, Mishpat u'Mimshal, 2018
The Doomsday Weapon, The article was published in the book ‘The Jewish Political tradition’ Volume 3, 2018
The Growing Trend of Divorcés without Divorce, Iunei Mishpat Journal, 2020
Women's entry and integration into Israel's legal Academia – History, Story, Non-Story and the MEN(tor), in Gender and Careers in the Legal Academy 215-231 (Ulrike Schultz, Gisela Shaw, Margaret Thornton, Rosemary Auchmuty, eds.) (Hart Publishing, 2021) (together with Eyal Katvan)
Disturbing Alienation, Nekudot Mifgash Journal, 2022

References

External links
 Ruth Halperin Kaddari SSRN Author Page
 Ruth Halperin Kaddari Linkedin Page
 Ruth Halperin Kaddari Bar Ilan University- Faculty of Law page
 Ruth Halperin Kaddari Founding Head of the Rackman Center

Israeli legal scholars
International law scholars
Family law scholars
United Nations Committee on the Elimination of Discrimination against Women members
Israeli feminists
Academic staff of Bar-Ilan University
Yale Law School alumni
1966 births
Living people
Israeli officials of the United Nations
Recipients of the International Women of Courage Award